Armored Core: Formula Front is a mecha video game developed by FromSoftware and published by Agetec. It was a launch title for the PlayStation Portable in Japan, the 10th main installment in the Armored Core series.

Gameplay
The player assumes the role of an Architect. An Architect is a person who builds, programs and battles with a modified Armored Core known as a u/AC or an Unmanned Armored Core. u/ACs are AI controlled Armored Cores which compete exclusively in battling tournaments. u/ACs battle independent of the Architect's control, so the Architect must influence how the u/AC fights by customizing various part combinations and loading various program functions into the u/AC's AI. The North American version of the PSP game has since been modified to allow players the option of actually piloting their u/AC in battle instead of letting the AI fight. In the game, this is called a N-u/AC (N standing for Naked) and is supposedly notoriously hard to control.

Armored Core: Formula Front allows the player to build their own robot using 480 different parts. These part come in several categories. These categories are head, core, arms, legs, generator, fire control system, booster, radiator, extension, inside, right arm weapon, left arm weapon, back left weapon, back right weapon, right hangar unit, left hangar unit, and optional parts. Several different part types can also be available. For instance, there are three types of cores (OB, EO, and Standard). Other types of customization include paint, AI tune, Parts Tune, Repository, Sortie Order, Name Entry, Sample Emblem, and Edit Emblem.

Story

Setting 
In the game's story, Formula Front is a worldwide competition in which unmanned, AI-controlled ACs [u-ACs] are pitted against one another in fiercely contested arena battles. The game takes place twenty-five years after Formula Front arena warfare was introduced. It is now the world's most popular form of entertainment. At the heart of Formula Front's success are the architects. These are the individuals responsible for assembling and programming the u-ACs entered into league matches.

Plot
As the player fights their way into the Regular League, they are confronted by a new team, BT Wyvern, and its architect, Linus. After two matches against BT Wyvern, Linus sends a message that he meet the player again. Rank after rank, the player again confronts a formidable opponent, Team Ogre, and its architect, Diablo. Though Ogre usually wins through harsh tactics, their battle against BT Wyvern was horrible. Fortunately, the player defeated Diablo. As the player gets nearer through the top ranks, they are again confronted by BT Wyvern with a new AC model, Force Wing X. Afterwards, Diablo confronts the player again with an AC similar to Linus' AC and has installed with a mysterious data in Diablo's AC. The player manages to defeat Diablo and Team Ogre was temporarily banned due to being accused of stealing the 'Master Data'.

After defeating the second rank Team Neonia and its architect, Raving, the player has the right to challenge Team Testarossa Artigiana ('Arti' for short) and FFA's top architect, Bren. After the player defeats Bren, they become the new top architect.

Release
Formula Front is the first Armored Core game to be released on multiple platforms, originally on the PlayStation Portable and later on the PlayStation 2. In Japan it was released simply as Armored Core: Formula Front. In North America, the game was modified and released on December 15, 2005 as Armored Core: Formula Front Extreme Battle, often mislabeled as Armored Core: Formula Front Special Edition; however, the PlayStation 2 version was not released in North America. The then-upcoming American version of the game was re-released on November 17, 2005 in Japan entitled ; this re-released edition is considered to be the ultimate edition as it also contains a large amount of additional battles not found in the American version of the game, and includes both Japanese and English text options (except for the tutorial videos which are only in Japanese). Later released fan-made patch addressed the issue, translating the videos.

Reception

The PSP version received "average" reviews according to the review aggregation website Metacritic. In Japan, Famitsu gave the game a score of 30 out of 40 (8/7/8/7) for the PSP version, and 28 out of 40 for the PlayStation 2 version.

Notes

References

External links
  
 

2004 video games
Armored Core
PlayStation 2 games
PlayStation Portable games
Video games about mecha
Third-person shooters
Multiplayer and single-player video games
Video games developed in Japan
505 Games games
Red Ant Enterprises games
Agetec games